The items in the Midtown Museum of Native Cultures are the private collection of Joyce "Koko" Jones, who owns and operates the institution. The museum hold pieces relating to indigenous peoples of the Americas.

External links
Midtown Museum Homepage

Museums in Montgomery County, Indiana
Native American museums in Indiana